Janczewo-Sukmanki  is a village in the administrative district of Gmina Szulborze Wielkie, within Ostrów Mazowiecka County, Masovian Voivodeship, in east-central Poland.

References

Janczewo-Sukmanki